Dennis Leslie Amiss  (born 7 April 1943) is a former English cricketer and cricket administrator. He played for both Warwickshire and England. Amiss is known for scoring the first ever century in ODI history, which was also his debut match. A right-handed batsman, he was a stroke maker particularly through extra cover and midwicket – his two favourite areas to score runs. He was an accomplished batsman in all forms of the game. He averaged 42.86 in first-class, 35.06 in List-A, 46.30 in Tests and 47.72 in One Day Internationals. In first-class cricket he scored 102 centuries, and his England record amassed over 50 Tests ranks him with the best England has produced.

After retiring as a player in 1987, he served Warwickshire as Chairman of the Cricket Committee, and he followed David Heath as chief executive from 1994 until 2006. In 1992 he was selected as an England selector. In November 2007 he became the deputy chairman of the England and Wales Cricket Board; in August 2011, The Daily Telegraph described his role on the board as providing "cricketing knowledge and expertise [that] complemented Clarke’s business skills."

Early years
Amiss was born at Harborne in Birmingham. He suffered a serious back injury whilst playing football in his teenage years, which entailed him starting each day of his sporting life undergoing stretching routines to loosen up.

England career 
Amiss made his Test debut for England in the fifth Test of the 1966 series with West Indies, and he proved an accomplished Test match batsman. He was one of the first batsmen to use a protective helmet. In scoring 3,612 Test runs, Amiss made eleven half-centuries and eleven centuries, including two double centuries against the West Indies. His highest Test match score, also his highest first-class score, was 262 not out against the West Indies in the 1973–74 Kingston Test, an innings that saved the Test match for England after they conceded a first innings lead of 230. The next highest score in England's innings was 38. After being dropped by England in 1975, he made a successful return against the West Indies at the Oval in the final Test of 1976, although his 203 in the first innings did not prevent England losing the match. Amiss's last Test came in 1977 when he was left out to make way for Geoff Boycott's return from self-imposed exile.

His former Warwickshire teammate, Jack Bannister, stated "Dennis was always tinkering with his game, he was a bigger perfectionist than Colin Cowdrey".

Amiss was also a handy One Day International batsman scoring 859 runs, including four centuries and one half-century, with a top score of 137 against India which is still England's fourth highest individual score in the Cricket World Cup, behind the 158 scored by Andrew Strauss against India in 2011, Jason Roy's 153 against Bangladesh in 2019, and Eoin Morgan's 148 against Afghanistan at the same tournament. He has the distinction of scoring the first ever One Day International century (103 in only the second One Day International on 24 August 1972) which is also the first instance of a debutant scoring a century in ODI. Amiss along with Keith Fletcher is also credited to have shared the first ever partnership of hundred runs in the same match. He ended with an ODI batting average of 47.72, which excepting those players to have played fewer than five times, remains the highest of any England batsman who has completed his career. The still-active Kevin Pietersen averaged over 50 throughout the first 60 matches of his ODI career up until September 2007, but that figure had fallen to under 41 by June 2011.

Amiss played World Series Cricket in the late 1970s in Australia; during the 1978 World Series Cricket tournament, he became the first player to wear a batting helmet regularly.

Amiss was banned from Test cricket for three years for taking part in the first 'rebel' tour of South Africa in 1982.

Honours
Amiss was selected as one of the five Wisden Cricketers of the Year in 1975.

Amiss was awarded an MBE in 1988; in 2007 he received a Doctor of the University from the University of Birmingham.

Records
Dennis Amiss is the first player in ODI cricket to have scored a century on both his debut and in his last match, the only other being Desmond Haynes. On 7 June 1975 at Lord's in the first match of the Prudential World Cup (which was also the very first Cricket World Cup to have been held) Amiss smashed 137 runs in just 147 balls against India powered by 18 boundaries. His innings provided enough leverage for England to post a very imposing and improbable target of 335 for India to be chased down within a span of 60 overs. It was also the first time that a team would score 300 or more runs in an ODI match. The match also featured the infamous and notorious ODI innings of Sunil Gavaskar who in reply to the nearly unreachable target set by England scored an unbeaten 36 in 174 balls with just one boundary to adorn his innings.

Others:

Amiss has shown gratitude to the Indian trio of Bishen Bedi, Venkatraghavan and Abid Ali who had bowled to him in practice which enabled Amiss to get adjusted to Indian condition, especially spin bowling. (Reference: Chapter 3, 'My Debt to Indians' - "In Search of Runs")

Dennis Amiss has written an Autobiography *In Search of Runs" in association with Michael Carey.

References

External links
 

1943 births
Living people
Cricketers at the 1975 Cricket World Cup
English cricket administrators
English cricketers
English cricketers of 1969 to 2000
England One Day International cricketers
England Test cricketers
International Cavaliers cricketers
Marylebone Cricket Club cricketers
Members of the Order of the British Empire
Secretaries of Warwickshire County Cricket Club
Cricketers from Birmingham, West Midlands
Warwickshire cricketers
Wisden Cricketers of the Year
World Series Cricket players
Cricketers who made a century on One Day International debut
People from Harborne
D. H. Robins' XI cricketers
T. N. Pearce's XI cricketers
Marylebone Cricket Club Under-25s cricketers
Marylebone Cricket Club President's XI cricketers
Marylebone Cricket Club Touring Team cricketers